The 25th Alaska State Legislature served for a term lasting from January 16, 2007 to January 19, 2009. All forty representatives and one-half of the senate (ten members) were elected to their terms on November 7, 2006. The remaining ten senators were elected to their terms on November 2, 2004.

Sessions
 First session: January 16, 2007 – May 16, 2007
 Second session: January 15, 2008 – April 13, 2008
 Special session: June 3, 2008 – August 7, 2008

In the 2006 elections, a voter initiative championed by freshman Fairbanks representative Jay Ramras was passed by voters, which reduced the statutory length of the session from the existing length of 120 days to 90 days. The changes to the law made by the initiative took effect with the second session of this legislature. Current legislation would make changes to accommodate a 90 session.

Although the second session adjourned on time, some members of the legislature claimed that legislation was rushed and public input was jeopardized.

Senate

Composition

Bipartisan coalition
Shortly after the 2006 November election, a bipartisan coalition was announced between all nine Democratic senators and six of the eleven Republican senators. Democrats will chair the Judiciary, Health, Education, & Social Services, Labor and Commerce, Community and Regional Affairs, and Transportation Committees, as well as co-chair the powerful Finance Committee. The Senate Republicans in the coalition will also had a co-chair for the Finance Committee (the minority Republicans were given one seat on the committee), and chair the State Affairs, Resources, and Rules Committees.

Because of the Republican split, the Democrats controlled a majority of committee chairmanships while Republicans in the governing coalition chair the others. The majority leader was the same legislator as it was in the last session, a Republican, who joined the bi-partisan coalition. Because of this, the minority leader was head of the five-member Republican organization. Hence, all three listed officers of the body were Republicans, as different aspects were in the majority (with the chamber-wide minority Democrats) while others are in the official minority.

The split was largely viewed as being over the Senate presidency. The minority leader was the Republicans' suspected, initial choice for Senate President. The coalition commanded three-quarters of the body.

A similar move was made in the 24th Legislature, on the House side. The coalition was later disbanded.

Leadership
The President of the Senate is Republican Lyda Green of District G (Matanuska-Susitna Valley). The Majority Leader is Republican Gary Stevens of District R (Kodiak). The Minority Leader is Republican Gene Therriault of District F (North Pole).

Membership

Alaska House of Representatives

Composition

Leadership

Members

See also
List of Alaska State Legislatures
24th Alaska State Legislature, the legislature preceding this one
26th Alaska State Legislature, the legislature following this one
 List of governors of Alaska
 List of speakers of the Alaska House of Representatives
 Alaska Legislature
 Alaska Senate
 {AKLeg.gov}

References

External links
All links listed below point to current pages related to the Alaska Legislature, not archives pertaining to this particular legislature

Alaska Legislature website
Alaska Senate website
Alaska House of Representatives website
AK Senate Bipartisan Working Group website
The Republican Senate Caucus website
The House Majority website 
The House Democratic Legislators website

2007 establishments in Alaska
Alaska
2008 in Alaska
Alaska
2009 disestablishments in Alaska
Alaska legislative sessions